Alfred Shipley Matts (2 April 1893 — 20 June 1970) was an English cricketer. He was a left-handed batsman and a left-arm bowler who played for Leicestershire.  

Matts was born in Barrow-upon-Soar and died in Anstey.

Matts made a single first-class appearance for the team, in 1921, against Yorkshire. From the lower order, he scored three runs in the first innings in which he batted and a duck in the second innings, as Leicestershire lost the game by an innings margin.

Notes

External links
Alfred Matts at Cricket Archive 

1893 births
1970 deaths
English cricketers
Leicestershire cricketers
People from Barrow upon Soar
Cricketers from Leicestershire